The Savoy Palace is a residential skyscraper located in Taichung's 7th Redevelopment Zone, Xitun District, Taichung, Taiwan. Construction of the building began in 2013 and it was completed in 2017. As of January 2021, it is the 18th tallest building in Taichung and 47th tallest in Taiwan.

Design
The exterior design of the building adopts the neo-classical style, with circular columns and stone steps that rise up to the porch of the ground floor, which displays ancient European criss-cross coat of arms. A revolving door leads into the -tall grand hall, where three Italian crystal chandeliers are hung from the ceiling and decorated with paintings of 17th-century townhouses. The backyard is equipped with a large vertical planted wall with an outdoor swimming pool. Facilities on the second floor include gyms, yoga rooms and a theatre; the third floor is designed with Chinese and Western style banquet halls. The Sky Lounge located on the top floor of the building is equipped with sofas, where one can view the night cityscape of Taichung. The basement houses an exhibition hall exhibiting a 1933 Rolls-Royce antique car.

See also 
 List of tallest buildings in Taiwan
 List of tallest buildings in Taichung
 Taichung's 7th Redevelopment Zone
 Fountain Palace
 Plato Palace

References

2017 establishments in Taiwan
Residential skyscrapers in Taiwan
Skyscrapers in Taichung
Taichung's 7th Redevelopment Zone
Apartment buildings in Taiwan
Residential buildings completed in 2017
Neoclassical architecture in Taiwan